Wellington "Duke" Reiter (born 1957), FAIA, is an American architect and urban designer, and a Senior Adviser at Arizona State University.

Biography

Reiter graduated with a B. Arch. from Tulane University in 1981, and an M. Arch. from the Harvard University School of Design in 1986. He founded a consultancy, Urban Instruments (1994-2003), and was Professor of Practice at MIT (1990-2003). He was Dean of the School of Design at Arizona State University (2003-2008). From 2008 to 2010 he was President of the School of the Art Institute of Chicago (SAIC), before returning to ASU in 2011, serving in a variety of roles, currently as 'Senior Adviser to the President'.

Reiter is particularly interested in the economic, cultural, and sustainability of major US metro areas and the engagement of the colleges and universities that are embedded within them. He was involved in the conceptualization and creation of the award-winning Downtown Phoenix Campus for Arizona State University (ASU). He works to grow the University City Exchange (UCX)  and advance integrative project frameworks that fuse university resources with urban development projects to address crucial issues.

He is a national trustee and chair of the University Development and Innovation Council for the Urban Land Institute.

Awards
 Arizona Architect's medal 
 Fellow of the American Institute of Architects.

Controversy
Reiter was Dean at ASU when an African-American Associate Professor, Theresa Cameron, was fired by the ASU President, Michael Crow in 2007, for the relatively minor misdemeanour of plagiarizing parts of class syllabi from colleagues after returning to work after medical leave and being given classes for which she was unprepared. The Dean and the President, in documented email correspondence, did not support her case, against advice from the Faculty Senate which also ruled on two other minor claims. Cameron filed suit in the U.S. District Court in Phoenix seeking an injunction against the Arizona Board of Regents and Arizona State University, alleging violations of federal civil rights and employment laws that make it unlawful to discriminate on the basis of disability (the Americans with Disabilities Act), gender or race. She alleged her support for a minority colleague, and an earlier appeal to Reiter about her below-average salary, compounded workplace discrimination. Cameron lost the case against ASU on appeal in May, 2011. 
 

Reiter's term as president at SAIC was short, and media reports suggest several clashes occurred as he sought to overhaul and modernize the organization.

Books
Vessels and Fields (monograph). Princeton Architectural Press, 1996

References

1957 births
Living people
Heads of universities and colleges in the United States
American architects
Fellows of the American Institute of Architects
MIT School of Architecture and Planning faculty
Tulane School of Architecture alumni
Urban designers
Arizona State University faculty
School of the Art Institute of Chicago faculty
Harvard Graduate School of Design alumni